Outbreak is a 1995 American medical disaster film directed by Wolfgang Petersen and based on Richard Preston's 1994 nonfiction book The Hot Zone. The film stars Dustin Hoffman, Rene Russo, Morgan Freeman and Donald Sutherland, and co-stars Cuba Gooding Jr., Kevin Spacey and Patrick Dempsey.

The film focuses on an outbreak of a fictional ebolavirus- and orthomyxoviridae-like Motaba virus, in Zaire and later in a small town in California. It is primarily set in the United States Army Medical Research Institute of Infectious Diseases and the Centers for Disease Control and Prevention and the fictional town of Cedar Creek, California. Outbreak plot speculates how far military and civilian agencies might go to contain the spread of a deadly, contagious disease.

The film, released on March 10, 1995, was a box-office success, and Spacey won two awards for his performance. A real-life outbreak of the Ebola virus was occurring in Zaire when the film was released.

Plot

In 1967, during the Stanleyville mutinies, a virus called Motaba, which causes a deadly fever, is discovered in the African jungle. To keep the virus a secret, U.S. Army officers Donald McClintock and William Ford destroy the camp where soldiers were infected.

Twenty-eight years later, Colonel Sam Daniels, a USAMRIID virologist, is sent to investigate an outbreak in Zaire. He and his crew—Lieutenant Colonel Casey Schuler and new recruit Major Salt—gather information and return to the United States. Ford, now a brigadier general and Daniels' superior officer, dismisses the latter's fears that the virus will spread.

A white-headed capuchin monkey that is host to the virus is smuggled into the country. James "Jimbo" Scott, a worker at an animal testing laboratory, is infected when he steals the monkey to sell on the black market. Jimbo takes the monkey to Rudy Alvarez, a pet-store proprietor in the coastal-California village of Cedar Creek. He fails to sell the monkey after it scratches Rudy, who also becomes infected. After releasing the monkey into the woods outside of the nearby community of Palisades, he develops symptoms on a flight to Boston and infects his girlfriend, Alice, at the airport. Their illness is investigated by Dr. Roberta Keough, a CDC scientist and Daniels' ex-wife. Jimbo, Alice, and Rudy die, but Keough determines that no one else in Boston was infected.

A hospital technician in Cedar Creek is infected when he accidentally breaks the vial of Rudy's blood. The virus quickly mutates into a strain capable of spreading like influenza, becoming airborne and causing a number of people to be infected in a movie theater. Daniels flies to Cedar Creek against Ford's orders, joining Keough's team with Schuler and Salt. As they begin a search for the monkey, the Army quarantines the town and imposes martial law. Schuler is infected when his suit tears and Keough accidentally sticks herself with a contaminated needle while treating him.

When Ford provides an experimental serum which cures the original strain, Daniels realizes that his superiors were aware of the virus before the outbreak. Daniels learns about Operation Clean Sweep, a plan for the military to contain the virus by bombing Cedar Creek, incinerating the entire town and its residents, ostensibly to prevent Motaba's expansion to pandemic proportions. However, McClintock, now a major general, plans to use the operation to conceal the mutated virus' existence so the original strain can be preserved for use as a biological weapon.

To prevent Daniels from finding a cure, McClintock orders him arrested for carrying the virus. Daniels escapes before he and Salt fly a helicopter to the ship at sea which carried the monkey. Daniels obtains a picture of the monkey and releases it to the media; a Palisades resident, Mrs. Jeffries, realizes that her daughter Kate has been playing with the monkey (which she named Betsy) and calls the CDC. Daniels and Salt arrive at the Jeffries' house where Salt tranquilizes Betsy after Kate coaxes her out of hiding in the woods nearby. When he learns from Daniels about Betsy's capture, Ford delays the bombing.

On their return flight, Daniels and Salt are chased by McClintock in another helicopter. Salt fires two rockets into the trees to deceive him into thinking that they crashed. Once back in Cedar Creek, Salt mixes Betsy's antibodies with Ford's serum to create an antiserum; although Schuler has died, they save Keough. McClintock returns to base and resumes Operation Clean Sweep, refusing to listen to Ford. Daniels and Salt fly their helicopter directly into the path of the bomber's approach to its target.

With Ford's help, Daniels persuades the bomber's flight crew to detonate the thermobaric bomb over water and spare the town. Before McClintock can order another bombing, Ford relieves him of command and orders his arrest. Daniels and Keough reconcile as Cedar Creek's residents are cured.

Cast

Production
Scenes in "Cedar Creek" were filmed in Ferndale, California, where tanks and helicopters were a common feature of daily life during nearly two months of filming. Other locations used were Dugway Proving Ground and Kauai.

Harrison Ford was offered the role of Sam Daniels, but turned it down. Sylvester Stallone and Mel Gibson were also offered the role, but turned it down.

Producer Lynda Obst has stated that it was due to the production of Outbreak that her film adaptation of The Hot Zone was dropped by 20th Century Fox despite having, in her words, "the better package and ... the better script". She also claimed that director Wolfgang Petersen tried to entice Robert Redford, who was already cast for her film, to be a part of Outbreak, based on Redford's call to her. Obst would eventually have her adaptation of the book, but greenlit as a miniseries by National Geographic, which premiered in May 2019.

Release

Box office
Outbreak  was a commercial success. It topped the U.S. box-office list its opening weekend with a gross of $13.4 million, and spent three weeks at number one before Tommy Boys release. It was number one in Japan for six weeks.  The film grossed $67.7 million in the United States and Canada and $122.2 million internationally for a worldwide total of $189.9 million.

Critical reception
Outbreak received mixed reviews from critics. According to the review aggregator website Rotten Tomatoes, 59% of 64 critics gave the film a positive review, with an average rating of 5.7 out of 10. The website's consensus states: "A frustratingly uneven all-star disaster drama, Outbreak ultimately proves only mildly contagious and leaves few lasting side effects." On Metacritic, the film has a weighted average score of 64 out of 100 based on 21 critic reviews, indicating "generally favorable reviews". Audiences polled by CinemaScore gave the film an average grade of "A−" on an A+ to F scale.

Roger Ebert of the Chicago Sun-Times gave it three-and-a-half out of four stars, calling Outbreak premise "one of the great scare stories of our time, the notion that deep in the uncharted rain forests, deadly diseases are lurking, and if they ever escape their jungle homes and enter the human bloodstream, there will be a new plague the likes of which we have never seen." Rita Kempley of The Washington Post also enjoyed the film's plot: "Outbreak is an absolute hoot thanks primarily to director Wolfgang Petersen's rabid pacing and the great care he brings to setting up the story and its probability."

David Denby wrote for New York magazine that although the opening scenes were well-done, "somewhere in the middle ... Outbreak falls off a cliff" and becomes "lamely conventional." Janet Maslin of The New York Times also found the film's subject compelling but its treatment ineffective: "The film's shallowness also contributes to the impression that no problem is too thorny to be solved by movie heroics."

Scientific accuracy
The film's scientific liberties have been criticized, especially compared to the realism of the 2011 film Contagion. Implausibilities include the virus taking only an hour, rather than days, to reproduce itself; the synthesis of the cure taking less than a minute, rather than many months; and the injection of the cure producing immediate improvement.

Accolades
New York Film Critics Circle Awards: Kevin Spacey – Best Supporting Actor (Won) – Also includes Spacey's work in Se7en, Swimming with Sharks, and The Usual Suspects
Society of Texas Film Critics Awards: Kevin Spacey – Best Supporting Actor (Won) – Also includes Spacey's work in Se7en and The Usual Suspects

Later popularity
The film's popularity resurged during the COVID-19 pandemic, ranking as the fourth most streamed film on Netflix in the United States on March 13, 2020.

References

External links

 
 
 
 
 

1990s disaster films
1995 action thriller films
1995 films
American disaster films
American action thriller films
Biological weapons in popular culture
Ebola in popular culture
Films scored by James Newton Howard
Films about viral outbreaks
Films based on military novels
Films directed by Wolfgang Petersen
Films produced by Gail Katz
Films produced by Arnold Kopelson
Films set in 1967
Films set in 1995
Films set in Atlanta
Films set in California
Films set in San Francisco
Films set in Boston
Films set in the Democratic Republic of the Congo
Films set in the White House
Films shot in California
Films shot in Hawaii
Films shot in Utah
Warner Bros. films
Influenza outbreaks in popular culture
Films set in a movie theatre
Films with screenplays by Robert Roy Pool
1990s English-language films
1990s American films